Rustah may refer to:

 Rustah, name of a district in Isfahan area in Iran
 Ahmad ibn Rustah, a tenth-century Persian explorer and geographer

See also 

 Roosta (disambiguation)
 Rusta (disambiguation)